The Kirkwood Building in Kansas City, Missouri is a building from 1920. It was listed on the National Register of Historic Places in 2001.

It was designed by architects Wight and Wight in Early Commercial style.

References

Buildings and structures in Kansas City, Missouri
Buildings designated early commercial in the National Register of Historic Places
Commercial buildings on the National Register of Historic Places in Missouri
Commercial buildings completed in 1920
National Register of Historic Places in Kansas City, Missouri